An electronic identification ("eID") is a digital solution for proof of identity of citizens or organizations. They can be used to view to access benefits or services provided by government authorities, banks or other companies, for mobile payments, etc. Apart from online authentication and login, many electronic identity services also give users the option to sign electronic documents with a digital signature.

One form of eID is an electronic identification card (eIC), which is a physical identity card that can be used for online and offline personal identification or authentication. The eIC is a smartcard in ID-1 format of a regular bank card, with identity information printed on the surface (such as personal details and a photograph) and in an embedded RFID microchip, similar to that in biometric passports. The chip stores the information printed on the card (such as the holder's name and date of birth) and the holder's photo(s). Several photos may be taken from different angles along with different facial expressions, thus allowing the biometric facial recognition systems to measure and analyze the overall structure, shape and  proportions of the face. It may also store the holder's fingerprints. The card may be used for online authentication, such as for age verification or for e-government applications. An electronic signature, provided by a private company, may also be stored on the chip.

Countries which currently issue government-issued eIDs include Afghanistan, Bangladesh, Belgium, Bulgaria, Chile, Finland, Guatemala, Germany, India, Indonesia, Israel, Italy, Luxembourg, the Netherlands, Nigeria, Morocco, Pakistan, Peru, Portugal, Poland, Romania, Estonia, Latvia, Lithuania, Spain, Slovakia, Malta, and Mauritius. Germany, Uruguay and previously Finland have accepted government issued physical eICs. Norway, Sweden and Finland accept bank-issued eIDs (also known as BankID) for identification by government authorities. There are also an increasing number of countries applying electronic identification for voting (enrollment, issuing voter ID cards, voter identification and authentication, etc.), including those countries using biometric voter registration.

eID in Europe

European Union
According to the EU electronic identification and trust services (eIDAS) Regulation, described as a pan-European login system, all organizations delivering public digital services in an EU member state shall accept electronic identification from all EU member states from 29 September 2018.

Belgium

Belgium has been issuing eIDs since 2003, and all identity cards issued since 2004 have been electronic, replacing the previous plastic card.

Chip contents
The eID card contains a chip containing:

 the same information as legible on the card
 the address of the card holder
 the identity - and signature keys and certificates
 fingerprints
 place of birth

Using the eID
At home, the users can use their electronic IDs to log into specific websites (such as Tax-on-web, allowing them to fill in their tax form online). To do this the user needs

 an eID card
 a smartcard reader
 the eID middleware software

When other software (such as an Internet Browser) attempts to read the eID, the users are asked for confirmation for this action, and potentially even for their PIN.

Other applications include signing emails with the user's eID certificate private key. Giving the public key to your recipients allows them to verify your identity.

Kids ID
Although legally Belgian citizens only have to carry an ID from the age of 12, as of March 2009, a "Kids ID" has been introduced for children below this age, on a strictly voluntary basis. This ID, beside containing the usual information, also holds a contact number that people, or the child themselves, can call when they, for example, are in danger or had an accident. The card can be used for electronic identification after the age of six, and it does not contain a signing certificate as minors cannot sign a legally binding document. An important goal of the Kids-ID card is to allow children to join "youth-only" chat sites, using their eID to gain entrance. These sites would essentially block any users above a certain age from gaining access to the chat sessions, effectively blocking out potential pedophiles.

Bulgaria
Bulgaria introduced a limited scale proof-of-concept of electronic identity cards, called ЕИК (Eлектронна карта за идентичност), in 2013.

Croatia
Croatia introduced its electronic identity cards, called e-osobna iskaznica, on 8 June 2015.

Denmark
Electronic identities in Denmark issued by banks are called NemID. NemID authentication allows larger payments in MobilePay - a service used by more than half of the population as of 2017.

Estonia
The Estonian ID card is also used for authentication for Estonia's Internet-based voting system. In February 2007, Estonia was the first country to allow for electronic voting for parliamentary elections. Over 30,000 voters participated in the country's e-election.

At end of 2014 Estonia extended the Estonian ID Card to non-residents. The target of the project is to reach 10 million residents by 2025, which is 8 times more than the Estonian population of 1.3 million.

Finland
The Finnish electronic ID was first issued to citizens on 1 December 1999. Electronic identities in Finland are issued by banks. They make it possible to log into Finnish authorities, universities and banks, and to make larger payments using the MobilePay mobile payment service. The mobiilivarmenne is utilizing the mobile phone SIM card for authentication, and is financed by a fee to the mobile network operator for each authentication.

Germany
Germany introduced its electronic identity cards, called Personalausweis, in 2010.

Italy

Italy introduced its electronic identity cards, called Carta d'Identità Elettronica (in Italy identified with the acronym CIE), to replace the paper-based ID card in Italy. Since 4 July 2016, Italy is in the process of renewing all ID cards to electronic ID cards.

Latvia 
eID and eSignature service provider in Latvia is called eParaksts

Malta
Since 12 February 2014, Malta is in the process of renewing all ID cards to electronic ID cards.

Netherlands
Electronic identities in Netherlands are called DigiD and Netherlands is currently developing an eID scheme.

Norway
Electronic identities in Norway issued by banks are called BankID (different than Sweden's BankID). They make it possible to log into Norwegian authorities, universities and banks, and to make larger payments using the Vipps mobile payment service, used by more than half of the population as of 2017. The Norwegian BankID på mobil service is utilizing the mobile phone SIM card for authentication, and is financed by a fee to the mobile network operator for each authentication.

Spain
Electronic identity cards in Spain are called DNIe and have been issued since 2006.

Switzerland
SwissID,
developed by SwissSign,
is a certified digital ID in Switzerland offered since 2017 (2010–17 as SuisseID). As a base for a new Federal Act on Electronic Identification Services (e-ID Act),
an eID-concept had been developed by the authorities, yet experts criticized its technology part.
The law was accepted by the Swiss parliament on 29 September 2019. It would have updated current legislation and would have continued to allow private companies or public organizations to issue eIDs if certified by a new federal authority. However, an optional referendum called for a public vote on this issue in the weeks until Sunday, 7 March 2021. The vote resulted in 35.6% Yes and 64.4% No, rejecting the proposed new law.

SwissSign might develop the SwissID further, to make it compatible with future E-ID regulations.

Sweden
The most widespread electronic identification in Sweden is issued by banks and called BankID. The BankID may be in the form of a certificate file on disk, on card or on smart phones. The latter (Swedish mobile BankID service) was used by 84 percent of the Swedish population in 2019. A Mobile BankID login does not require a fee since the service is provided by banks rather than mobile operators. It can be used both for authentication within various apps and web services on the same smart phone, and also for web pages on other devices. It also supports fingerprint and face recognition authentication on compatible iOS and Android devices.

Electronic IDs are used for secure web login to Swedish authorities, banks, health centers (allowing people to see their medical records and prescriptions and book doctors visits), and companies such as pharmacies. Mobile BankID also allows the Swish mobile payment service, utilized by 78 percent of the Swedish population in 2019, at first mainly for payments between individuals. BankID was previously used for university applications and admissions, but this was prohibited by Swedbank since universities utilized the system for distribution of their own student logins. Increasingly, BankID is used as an added security for signing contracts.

eID in other countries

Afghanistan

Afghanistan issued its first electronic ID (e-ID) card on 3 May 2018. Afghan President Ashraf Ghani was the first to receive the card. Afghan President was accompanied by First Lady Rula Ghani, his VP, Head of Afghan Senate, Head of Afghan Parliament, Chief Justice and other senior government officials, and they also received their cards. As of January 2021, approximately 1.7 million Afghan citizens have obtained their e-ID cards.

Costa Rica
Costa Rica plans to introduce facial recognition data into its national identification card.

Guatemala
Guatemala introduced its electronic identity card called DPI (Documento Personal de Identificación) in August 2010.

India

Indonesia
Indonesian electronic ID was trialed in six areas in 2009 and launched nationwide in 2011.

Israel
Electronic identity cards in Israel have been issued since July 2013.

Kazakhstan
Kazakhstan introduced its electronic identity cards in 2009.

Mauritius
Mauritius has had electronic identity cards since 2013.

Mexico
Mexico had an intent to develop an official electronic biometric ID card for all youngsters under the age of 18 years and was called the Personal Identity Card (Record of Minors), which included the data verified on the birth certificate, including the names of the legal ascendant(s), a unique key of the Population Registry (CURP), a biometric facial recognition photograph, a scan of all 10 fingerprints, and an iris scan registration.

Nigeria
General Multi-purpose Electronic Identity Cards are issued by the National Identity Management Commission (NIMC), a Federal Government agency under the Presidency. The NeID Card complies with ICAO standard 9303, ISO standard 7816-4., as well as GVCP for the MasterCard-supported payment applet.
NIMC plans to issue 50m multilayer-polycarbonate cards, the first set being contact only, but also dual-interface with DESFire Emulation in the near future.

Pakistan

Pakistan officially began its nationwide Computerized National Identity Card (CNIC) distribution in 2002, with over 89.5 x CNICs issued by 2012. In October 2012, the National Database and Registration Authority (NADRA) introduced the smart national identity card (SNIC), which contains a data chip and 36 security features. The SNIC complies with ICAO standard 9303 and ISO standard 7816-4. The SNIC can be used for both offline and online identification, voting, pension disbursement, social and financial inclusion programmes and other services. NADRA aims to replace all 89.5 million CNICs with SNICs by 2020.

Serbia
Serbia has its first trustful and reliable electronic identity since June 2019. The first reliable service provider is The Office for IT and eGovernment, through which citizens and residents of Serbia can access services on eGovernment Portal and eHealth portal. The electronic identification offers two levels of security, first basic level with authentication of only user name and password, and medium level of two-factor of authentication.

Sri Lanka
Since on 1 January 2016, Sri Lanka is in the process of developing a Smart Card based RFID E-National Identity Card which will replace the obsolete 'Laminated Type' cards by storing the holders information on a chip that can be read by banks, offices etc. thereby reducing the need to have documentation of these informations physically by storing in the cloud.

Turkey
In Turkey the e-Government (e-Devlet) Gateway is a largely scaled Internet site that provides access to all public services from a single point. The purpose of the Gateway is to present public services to the citizens, enterprises and public institutions effectively and efficiently with information and communication technologies.

Uruguay
Uruguay has had electronic identity cards since 2015. The Uruguayan eID has a private key that allows to digitally sign documents, and has the user fingerprint stored in order to allow to verify the identity. It is also a valid travel document in some South American countries.
As of 2017 the old laminated ID coexists with the new eID.

Manufacturing
Electronic identification can also be attributed to the manufacturing sector, where the technology of electronic identification is transferred to individual parts or components within a manufacturing facility in order to track, and identify these parts to enhance manufacturing efficiency. This can also be referred to location detection technologies within the Fourth Industrial Revolution.

See also
 List of national identity card policies by country
 Self-sovereign identity

References

External links
 World Map of eID deployments

Identity documents
Identification